Villa Talea de Castro is a town and municipality in Oaxaca in south-western Mexico. It is part of the Villa Alta District in the center of the Sierra Norte Region.

As of 2013, the municipality had a population of 2500.

References

Municipalities of Oaxaca